Roja is the debut soundtrack album of music composer A. R. Rahman, featuring lyrics by Vairamuthu. It is the soundtrack to the 1992 Tamil film of the same name, directed by Mani Ratnam, and starring Aravind Swamy and Madhoo. The album features seven tracks in Tamil and Hindi, and six tracks in Malayalam, Telugu, Marathi and five tracks in the instrumental adaptation album.

The song "Thamizha Thamizha" is a poem written by Subramanya Bharathi. "Chinna Chinna Aasai" was the first song Rahman had composed for the film. The song "Kadhal Rojave" has two versions in both Tamil and Hindi; a solo and a duet in the former. The Hindi version of the song was titled "Roja Jaaneman" has two versions – one by S. P. Balasubrahmanyam and the other by Hariharan.

Released on Lahari Music, it was also listed in Time magazine's "10 Best Soundtracks" of all time. It also fetched the National Film Award for Best Music Direction for A. R. Rahman and the National Film Award for Best Lyrics for Vairamuthu.

The Tamil and Hindi versions of the album sold over million units in India, with the Tamil version selling over 200,000 units and the Hindi version selling 2.8million units. The Hindi version of the album earned  in sales.

Background
Mani Ratnam after his long relationship with Ilaiyaraaja, decided to collaborate with a newcomer. He initially approached advertisement jingle composer Mahesh Mahadevan, who refused since it required full-time commitment to the project. Ratnam happened to listen to some ad jingles, composed by Rahman, in an awards function, where Rahman received the award for Best Jingle Composer. Impressed with Rahman's works, Ratnam visited his studio and listened to a tune that Rahman had composed long back on the Kaveri River water dispute (later revealed to be "Tamizha Tamizha" from the soundtrack). Ratnam signed him immediately for his next project, Roja, which was the first one in his terrorism trilogy. Rahman, in spite of his reluctance to seriously take up work in films, accepted the offer since Ratnam had the reputation of a director with a good taste for music. Rahman would later say: "I wasn't sure myself why I accepted Roja. I was offered Rs 25,000 for it, a sum that I could make in three days composing ad jingles. I think it was the prospect of working with Mani that enticed me". In an August 2016 interview with Filmfare, Rahman recalled that he chose not to pursue education at Berklee College of Music because he got to work on Roja.

Development

Rahman used instruments and grand arrangements to generate an expansive sound. Songs such as "Rukkumani" had a loud thumping feel and became ingrained in pop culture. The score was performed at the Panchathan Record Inn in Chennai. The song "Thamizha Thamizha" is a poem written by Subramanya Bharathi. According to some sources, "Chinna Chinna Aasai" was the first song Rahman had composed for the film. However, there exists a different, conflicting account of how the melody came about. Veteran music director M.S. Viswanathan has said In a public speech delivered before an audience, that the tune to Chinna Chinna Aasai was, in fact, his composition. In the speech, M.S. Viswanathan talks about how the melody to Chinna Chinna Aasai was one of the many melodies he composed during a composing session for director K.Balachander's 1977 movie Pattina Pravesam. 

For the lyrics of song, Vairamuthu revealed that the song took two and half hours to write and he wrote 120 desires in the song but later shortened it into 16 and also revealed that he used the lines of a song which was originally composed for Doordarshan. The song "Kadhal Rojave" is set in the Kapi raga.

Regarding the music Mani Ratnam says, "I was trying to do a film, I wanted good music and I was searching for somebody who would and I heard a demonstration tape of his which he had sent across. I thought that in the first note of the piece that he had sent me was really brilliant, really outstanding piece. So I went across to his studio and he played me some more, lots of things which he had done for jingles and a few other musical pieces he has done for somebody else. They were quite amazing and I had no doubts that he would be right for my film. How much he would grow, I was not looking at. I was looking at predominately my film at that point of time. He was ready to break a lot of conventions that were there in terms of music at that point of time, in terms of recording at that point in time. So I was very lucky to find someone who was willing to break away and do something different." For the Hindi version of the soundtrack, Alka Yagnik and Kumar Sanu were offered to sing the songs, but both declined as they did not know about Rahman at that time.

Release history 
The soundtrack album was originally released in Tamil by Lahari Music on 27 July 1992. The soundtrack was later released in Malayalam and Telugu in 1993 and in Hindi and Marathi in 1994 by Magnasound. The instrumental special version featuring five songs was released in Tamil and Telugu by Lahari Music in 1993 and in Hindi by Magnasound in 1994.

Reception and influence

Rahman introduced new orchestral melodies in Indian film soundtracks, which till then was based on a few traditional Indian instruments. Time magazine's noted film critic, Richard Corliss stated in 2005 that the "astonishing debut work parades Rahman's gift for alchemizing outside influences until they are totally Tamil, totally Rahman," naming it one of the magazine's "10 Best Soundtracks" of all time.
Recalling the massive success of his first film, Rahman says, "I was lucky to set a sound in the first film. And I had the right people like Mani Ratnam guiding me to achieve it also and by the grace of Almighty God it set and the people know from the moment the song is heard that this is Rahman's."

Through Roja several singers got their breakthrough in the Tamil music scene as well. Sujatha Mohan, Unni Menon and Minmini, who is only known as the singer of "Chinna Chinna Aasai", probably her best known song in her entire career, were noticed following their performances in Roja, while noted ghazal singer Hariharan made his Tamil debut through this album. Rahman even had musically untrained elderly women sing. A Bengali song was made from song "Chinna Chinna Aasai", "Chotto ei grame choto ai aasha", from Bengali film Ranga Bou 1999.

Awards
A. R. Rahman won the National Film Award for Best Music Direction, the first time ever by a debutant. Rahman also earned Tamil Nadu State Film Award for Best Music Director and Filmfare Best Music Director Award (Tamil) for his work. Vairamuthu won the National Film Award for Best Lyrics for "Chinna Chinna Aasai", while Minmini won the Tamil Nadu State Film Award for Best Female Playback for the same song.

Track listing

Tamil

Hindi

Malayalam

Telugu

Marathi

Instrumental adaptation
An instrumental adaptation album was also released. The album was released in Tamil, Telugu and Hindi.

References

Further reading

External links
 A. R. Rahman Official site
 Official Soundtrack of Roja on Gaana

A. R. Rahman soundtracks
Tamil film soundtracks
1992 debut albums
1992 soundtrack albums
Hindi film soundtracks